The Marshall Comets were a Lone Star League minor league baseball team based in Marshall, Texas that played in 1947. Paul Kardow managed the team for part of the year. In its lone year of existence, the team was 76-63, finishing third in the standings and losing the league finals.

References

Baseball teams established in 1947
Defunct minor league baseball teams
Sports clubs disestablished in 1947
1947 establishments in Texas
1947 disestablishments in Texas
Defunct baseball teams in Texas
Baseball teams disestablished in 1947